Annappanpettai Sundareswarar Temple (அன்னப்பன்பேட்டை சுந்தரேஸ்வரர் கோயில்) is a Hindu temple located at Annappanpettai in Mayiladuthurai district of Tamil Nadu, India. The historical name of the place is Kalikamoor. The presiding deity is Shiva. He is called as Sundareswarar. His consort is known as Azhagammai.

Significance 
It is one of the shrines of the 275 Paadal Petra Sthalams - Shiva Sthalams glorified in the early medieval Tevaram poems by Tamil Saivite Nayanar Tirugnanasambandar. The place is Kollikamur and sage Parasara is believed to have worshipped the presiding deity.

Literary mentions 
Tirugnanasambandar describes the feature of the deity as:

References

External links 
 
 

Shiva temples in Nagapattinam district
Padal Petra Stalam